Thomas Tudor Tucker, C.B. (1775–1852) was a British sailor from Bermuda. He was a Rear Admiral in the British Navy.

Life
He was named for an uncle, Thomas Tudor Tucker, who served as Treasurer of the United States. The third of the eight sons (all in the public service) of Henry Tucker, secretary of the council of the Bermudas, he was born on 29 June 1775; Henry St George Tucker was his eldest brother.

On her way homewards Sceptre was lost in Table Bay, on 5 November 1799. Many of her crew perished, and Tucker was left to find his own passage to England.

He was then appointed by the admiral acting commander of HMS Dolphin, and, in succession, of several other ships; but his rank was not confirmed till 15 February 1808. In April he was moved into .

In February 1810 Tucker assisted in the reduction of Guadeloupe. On the special recommendation of the commander-in-chief, Sir Francis Laforey promoted him to post rank on 1 August 1811. Remaining in Cherub, he sailed to England in September 1812, in charge of a large convoy.

In August 1815 Cherub returned to England, and was paid off.

On 4 July 1840 he was nominated a Companion of the Order of the Bath; and on 1 October 1846 was put on the retired list, with the rank of rear-admiral. He died in London on 20 July 1852.

Family
Tucker married, in 1811, Anne Byam Wyke, eldest daughter of Daniel Hill of Antigua, and left a son and three daughters.

See also

Notes

Attribution

1775 births
Royal Navy rear admirals
Companions of the Order of the Bath
Thomas Tudor
1852 deaths